† Potamides archiaci is an extinct species of sea snail, marine gastropod molluscs in the family Potamididae.

The specific name archiaci is in honour of French paleontologist Adolphe d'Archiac, who was one of the pioneering researchers to describe molluscs from the Indian subcontinent. Type specimen are deposited in the Department of Geology, Presidency University, Kolkata.

Distribution 

This species occurred in the lower Middle Eocene of Kutch District, Gujarat, western India. The type locality is about 2 km north of village Harudi , Harudi Formation, lower Middle Eocene.

Description
Potamides archiaci is placed to the genus Potamides according to its shape, coiling pattern, and typical ornamentation.

The shell is small, narrow, turretedand conical. The spire is high. The shell is widening slowly. Apical angle is small. The shell has about 15 depressed whorls. whorls are separated by prominently impressed suture. The base of the shell flat. The aperture is elliptical. There are two prominent rows of spiral tubercles on the sculpture. Surface in earliest whorls is marked only by a beaded angularity. Posterior beads become stronger tubercles and more distantly spaced than the anterior beads.

The width of the holotype is 5.9 mm. The reconstructed height of the holotype is about 24 mm. The maximum measured width of the shell is 8.05 mm. The maximum reconstructed shell height is 31.22 mm.

References 
This article include CC-BY-3.0 text from the reference

External links 

Potamididae
Prehistoric gastropods
Gastropods described in 2014